General elections were held in Dominica on 21 July 1980. The result was a victory for the Dominica Freedom Party, which won 17 of the 21 seats, whilst the ruling Dominica Labour Party lost all 16 seats after nineteen years in power. Voter turnout was 80.2%.

Results

References

Dominica
Elections in Dominica
General
Dominica